Egg is the 1970 debut album by British progressive rock band Egg.

Track listing
The album was originally released on vinyl by Deram.

All songs by Clive Brooks, Mont Campbell and Dave Stewart, except where noted.

Side one
 "Bulb" (Peter Gallen) – 0:09
 "While Growing My Hair" – 3:53
 "I Will Be Absorbed" – 5:10
 "Fugue in D Minor" (Johann Sebastian Bach) – 2:46
 "They Laughed When I Sat Down at the Piano…" – 1:17
 "The Song of McGillicudie the Pusillanimous (Or Don't Worry James, Your Socks Are Hanging in the Coal Cellar with Thomas)" – 5:07
 "Boilk" – 1:00

Side two
 "Symphony No. 2" – 20:43
Movement 1
Movement 2
Blane
Movement 4

2004 re-issue
The album was re-issued on CD in February 2004 by Eclectic Discs. Remastered from the original tapes, the re-issue has three bonus tracks, including both sides of the band's first and only single ("Seven Is a Jolly Good Time/You Are All Princes") and "Movement 3" from "Symphony No. 2", which was omitted from the original LP due to copyright difficulties because its tune bears a similarity to part of Igor Stravinsky's ballet The Rite of Spring. There are also similarities to the final Neptune movement of Gustav Holst's orchestral suite The Planets.

The track listing is as follows:

 "Bulb" – 0:09
 "While Growing My Hair" – 4:02
 "I Will Be Absorbed" – 5:11
 "Fugue in D Minor" – 2:49
 "They Laughed When I Sat Down at the Piano…" – 1:21
 "The Song of McGillicudie the Pusillanimous (or don't worry James, your socks are hanging in the coal cellar with Thomas)"  – 5:07
 "Boilk" – 1:04
 "Symphony No. 2" – 23:54
Movement 1 – 5:47
Movement 2 – 6:18
Blane – 5:28
Movement 3 – 3:11 *
Movement 4 – 3:10
 "Seven Is a Jolly Good Time" – 2:47 *
 "You Are All Princes" – 3:45 *

Personnel
 Dave Stewart - Hammond organ, piano, tone generator, Mellotron
 Mont Campbell - bass, vocals (2, 3, 6)
 Clive Brooks - drums

References

External links
Lyrics to Egg
 

Egg (band) albums
1970 debut albums
Deram Records albums
Albums produced by Dave Stewart (keyboardist)
Albums produced by Mont Campbell
Albums produced by Clive Brooks